{{DISPLAYTITLE:C12H15N3O2}}
The molecular formula C12H15N3O2 (molar mass: 233.266 g/mol) may refer to:

 Pardoprunox
 Phenylpiracetam hydrazide

Molecular formulas